Amazon Echo, often shortened to Echo, is an American brand of smart speakers developed by Amazon. Echo devices connect to the voice-controlled intelligent personal assistant service Alexa, which will respond when a user says "Alexa". Users may change this wake word to "Amazon", "Echo", "Computer", as well as some other options. The features of the device include voice interaction, music playback, making to-do lists, setting alarms, streaming podcasts, and playing audiobooks, in addition to providing weather, traffic and other real-time information. It can also control several smart devices, acting as a home automation hub.

Amazon started developing Echo devices inside its Lab126 offices in Silicon Valley and in Cambridge, Massachusetts as early as 2010. The device represented one of its first attempts to expand its device portfolio beyond the Kindle e-reader.

Amazon initially limited the first-generation Echo to Amazon Prime members or just by invitation, but it became widely available in the United States in mid 2015, and subsequently in other countries. Additionally, the Alexa voice service is available to be added to other devices, and Amazon encourages other companies' devices and services to connect to it.

History

Work on the Amazon Echo began in 2011, known as "Project D". It was named this because the Kindle was Project A and the Fire Phone was Project B. The Amazon Echo was an offshoot of Project C. Project C is unknown, even though the work on it has stopped. The Amazon Echo was originally supposed to be called the Amazon Flash. The wake word, the word that makes the device responsive, for the Echo used to be "Amazon". Both of these attributes were disliked by Lab126, the division of Amazon that conducts research and development and creates computer hardware. Lab126 believed that "Amazon" is too much of a commonly used word, and the device would react when it was not intended to. Jeff Bezos, the CEO of Amazon, ended up being influenced by Lab126 to change the name of the device to the Amazon Echo and the wake word to "Alexa". The Amazon Echo was originally pitched as only a smart speaker, it was not originally intended to be a smart home hub, as it is now, until after it was launched. As Alexa, the artificial intelligence (A.I.) that powers the Amazon Echo, improved, the device became more of a controlling center for smart home appliances. Dave Isbitski, the chief developer evangelist for the Echo and Alexa, received calls from smart home manufacturers to discuss connecting their devices, after the release of the Amazon Echo. But smart home devices had a problem: people were not buying smart home devices because they often required an extra app in order to be used, which was not much better than just using the device manually.

The Amazon Echo (1st Generation) was initially released in March 2014 for Amazon Prime and invited members, and was marketed alongside the voice of the product, Alexa. Alexa is a voice associated with the Amazon Echo that will respond to questions and requests through artificial intelligence. Amazon has claimed that the voice of Alexa was inspired by electronic communications systems featured in the television series Star Trek: The Original Series and Star Trek: The Next Generation.

The Echo featured prominently in Amazon's first Super Bowl broadcast television advertisement in 2016.

In March 2016 Amazon released a byproduct of the Amazon Echo, called the Amazon Echo Dot. This device is an ice hockey puck sized version of the original Amazon Echo released in 2014, and it has the same capabilities. This product was designed to be used in smaller rooms such as bedrooms due to its limited speaker capabilities (size) or to be paired with an external speaker. In November 2016 the second generation of the Echo Dot was released for a lower price with improved voice recognition and new colors.

The second generation of the Amazon Echo was released in October 2017. This update offered better voice recognition and a fabric covering exterior. Subsequently, other variants of the Amazon Echo have been released.

In May 2017 Amazon released the now-discontinued Amazon Tap, a portable, slightly smaller version of the Amazon Echo. Although the two products are similar the Tap is battery powered, portable, and requires the touch of a button in order to enable voice commands.

In April 2017 the Amazon Echo Look was released to invitees only, as an Amazon Echo with a built in camera. It was designed as a speaker, that is also handy with artificial intelligence that has smart algorithms to help users pick out outfits. It was released to the general public in August 2018.

In June 2018 the Amazon Echo Show was released to the public as a device with a 7-inch screen used for streaming media, making video calls and the use of Alexa. The second generation of the device was made available in November 2018 and features a 10-inch screen with improved speakers.

Features

Overview of operation
In the default mode, the device continuously listens to all speech, monitoring for the wake word to be spoken, which is primarily set up as "Alexa" (derived from Alexa Internet, the Amazon-owned Internet indexing company). Echo's microphones can be manually disabled by pressing a mute button to turn off the audio processing circuit.

Echo devices require a wireless Internet connection in order to work. Echo's voice recognition capability is based on Amazon Web Services and the voice platform Amazon acquired from Yap, Evi, and IVONA (a Polish-based specialist in voice technologies used in the Kindle Fire). Echo device requires one time setup by pairing it with your Alexa app which gives you more control over the features.

The smart speakers perform well with a "good" (low-latency) Internet connection, which minimizes processing time due to minimal communication round trips, streaming responses and geo-distributed service endpoints. While the application is free, an Amazon account is required, and setup is not possible without one.

Available services
Echo devices offer weather from AccuWeather and news from a variety of sources, including local radio stations, BBC, NPR, and ESPN from TuneIn and iHeartRadio. Echo can play music from the owner's Amazon Music accounts and has built-in support for other streaming music services like Amazon Music, Apple Music, Spotify, Deezer, Pandora and Sirius XM among others, and has support for IFTTT and Nest thermostats. Echo can also play music from non-compatible music streaming services such as Google Play Music from a phone or tablet via Bluetooth. Echo maintains voice-controlled alarms, timers, shopping and to-do lists and can access Wikipedia articles. Echo will respond to questions about items in one's Google Calendar. It also integrates with Yonomi, Philips Hue, Belkin Wemo, SmartThings, Insteon, and Wink. Additionally, integration with the Echo is in the works for Countertop by Orange Chef, Sonos, Scout Alarm, Garageio, Toymail, MARA, and Mojio. Questions like "Who is Barack Obama?" are answered by reading the first few lines of the corresponding Wikipedia article.

Echo devices also have access to "skills" built with the Alexa Skills Kit. These are third-party-developed voice applications that add to the capabilities of any Alexa-enabled device (such as the Echo). Examples of skills include the ability to play music, answer general questions, set an alarm, order a pizza or a ridesharing car (e.g., Uber, Lyft), and more. Skills are continuously being added to increase the capabilities available to the user. For example, one new skill that Alexa has learned is the ability to play "games" with users. One such game is "Escape the Garage" in which the user must correctly answer questions that Alexa asks, while figuring out a way to escape. The Alexa Skills Kit is a collection of self-service application programming interfaces  (API), tools, documentation and code samples that make it fast and easy for any developer to add skills to Alexa. Developers can also use the "Smart Home Skill API", a new addition to the Alexa Skills Kit, to easily teach Alexa how to control cloud-controlled lighting and thermostat devices. All of the code runs in the cloud and nothing is on any user device. A developer can follow tutorials to learn how to quickly build voice-response capability for their new and existing applications.

In November 2018, a major new feature was launched that will allow users to make Skype calls. Every past and present Echo device will be able to dial a number via Skype. Echo devices that have a display will offer full video Skype capability.

In May 2019, Amazon released Alexa Guard.  If "Away mode" is enabled, if an Echo device detects the sound of smoke alarms, carbon monoxide alarms, or glass breaking, it will send alerts to the Alexa app on smartphones. If the user has professional monitoring, it can send alerts directly to the security provider. It can also switch smart lights on and off to make it look like someone is home. Amazon also offers Guard Plus, this paid for option enables other features such as playing the sound of a dog barking when an intruder is detected.

Voice Services
The Alexa Voice Service (AVS) allows developers to voice-enable connected products with a microphone and speaker. The AVS enables volume control, audio playback, and speech recognition. The devices have natural lifelike voices resulting from speech-unit technology. High speech accuracy is achieved through sophisticated natural language processing (NLP) algorithms built into the Echo's text-to-speech (TTS) engine.

Software updates
As with all Alexa devices, the functionality of Echo smart speakers periodically evolves as Amazon releases new software for it. Most new releases fix bugs in addition to including enhanced functionality. New releases are pushed to the devices on a gradual basis so it may take several days to a week or more for a particular device to be updated. Because much of Echo's intelligence lies in the cloud, significant functional enhancements can be made to Echo without updating the software version it is running. For example, in April 2015, the Echo added the ability to give live sports scores without updating the software version running on the device.

Smart Home
The Amazon Echo is able to connect to many different smart home devices. Thermostats, humidifiers, lightbulbs, plugs, dog and cat feeder,  door locks, cameras, thermostats, security systems, speakers, WiFi, televisions, vacuums, microwaves, printers, and other smart home devices can now all be controlled through Alexa. Alexa can be used to activate and deactivate all of these smart home appliances, as well as change their settings depending on the device. For example, Alexa can be used to change the temperature in a house through a thermostat, turn off the lights with smart lights, put out dog or cat food via a smart pet feeder, and activate the security systems via a smart security system. The user is able to organize these smart home devices by putting them into groups. For example, a user can make a "Music Group" on the Amazon Echo. The Amazon Echo will be able to play music and other media in multiple rooms in a house through other Echos and speakers that are in the "Music Group". Along with multiple groups, an Amazon Echo can hold multiple profiles. Switching between the profiles can allow users to play their music, access their calendars, and use their accounts for shopping, instead of just using one person's.

In December 2021, an outage of Amazon's cloud service caused smart home devices to stop working.

Hands-free
Amazon Echos are able to make calls and send messages. Users can make calls to another Amazon Echo or speaker that is in the house by calling the device name. Users can also make calls and send messages to other people that have an Amazon Echo. This is done by connecting the user's contacts to the Amazon Echo. The user's Amazon Echo will call their contact's Amazon Echo. They will be able to have a conversation using the Amazon Echos. Messages will go to the contact's phone, in the Alexa App. The message can also be played on the Echo.

Variants

Echo 

The first-generation Amazon Echo consists of a 9.25 inch (23.5 cm) tall cylinder speaker with a seven-piece microphone array.
The Echo hardware complement includes a Texas Instruments DM3725 ARM Cortex-A8 processor, 256MB of LPDDR1 RAM and 4GB of storage space. , the first-generation Echo maintained an 83% score on GearCaliber, a review aggregator.

Although the Echo is intended to be voice-controlled at the unit, a microphone-enabled remote control similar to the one bundled with the Amazon Fire TV is available for purchase. The remote was also bundled with early units. An action button on top of the unit is provided for user setup in a new location, and the mute button allows the microphones to be turned off. The top half-inch of the unit rotates to increase or decrease the speaker volume. The Echo must be plugged in to operate since it has no internal battery.

Echo provides dual-band Wi-Fi 802.11a/b/g/n and Bluetooth Advanced Audio Distribution Profile (A2DP) support for audio streaming and Audio/Video Remote Control Profile (AVRCP) for voice control of connected mobile devices.

The mainline Linux kernel is able to boot the Amazon Echo since version 5.6.

In September 2020, the 4th gen Echo was announced replacing the Echo and Echo Plus devices in a new spherical form-factor. The Echo brings the Echo Plus' Zigbee smart home hub with support for Amazon Sidewalk.

Limited editions 
As part of a holiday promotion, Seattle Seahawks player Marshawn Lynch drove the Treasure Truck around Seattle in December 2016 selling a limited-edition beast-mode Echo with a custom skin. The beast-mode version was a first-generation Echo that responded to a user's commands with Marshawn Lynch's voice, instead of the Alexa voice.

In November 2017, a Product Red version of the second-generation Echo was announced as a limited edition item.

Another special version of Echo is the Alexa Super Skills Collectible edition, which was given to select Amazon Alexa developers who published five skills between July 22 and October 30, 2017. This special variant comes with a white mask, a blue cape, and a blue belt.

Availability 
Amazon initially limited the first-generation Echo to Amazon Prime members or just by invitation, but it became widely available in the United States in mid 2015. In 2016, the Echo became available in the United Kingdom and Germany.

, the Echo was available in 40 countries: Austria, Australia, Belgium, Bolivia, Bulgaria, Canada, Chile, Colombia, Costa Rica, Cyprus, the Czech Republic, Ecuador, El Salvador, Estonia, Finland, Germany, Greece, Hungary, Iceland, India, Ireland, Italy, Japan, Latvia, Liechtenstein, Lithuania, Luxembourg, Malta, Mexico, New Zealand, Panama, Peru, Poland, Portugal, Slovakia, Sweden, the United Kingdom, the United States, and Uruguay.

In 2018, Amazon and Microsoft jointly announced a solution to integrate their digital assistants so that Cortana, Microsoft's voice assistant, could be called from an Amazon Echo device and Alexa could be called from Windows devices, including PCs. In January 2019, Microsoft CEO Satya Nadella announced that Cortana would no longer be a platform competitor to Alexa or Google Assistant, but rather a voice skill to access Microsoft 365 via other voice assistants. As of April 2019, Alexa was the only Cortana-integrated voice assistant, which gave it exclusive access to Microsoft's suite of business applications.

Echo Dot

1st Gen 
In March 2016, Amazon unveiled the original Amazon Echo Dot, which is a hockey puck-sized version of the Echo designed to be connected to external speakers due to the smaller size of the onboard speakers, or to be used in rooms such as the bedroom as an alternative to the full-sized Echo. Beyond these distinctions, the Amazon Echo Dot possesses the same functions as the original Amazon Echo.

External third-party portable batteries are available for the Dot.

2nd Gen 
The second generation of the Amazon Echo Dot became available on October 20, 2016. It is priced lower, has improved voice recognition, and is available in black, grey and  white. The Echo Spatial Perception (ESP) technology allows several Echo and Dot units to work together so that only one device answers the request. , the Echo Dot maintained a 78% score on GearCaliber, based on 23 reviews.

On August 18, 2017, an Amazon promotion allowed Amazon Prime customers to receive a 100% price reduction on the Echo Dot (from $49.99 to $0.00). Amazon never commented on the promotion or gave any indication of how many Dots were given away.

3rd Gen 
In September 2018, an updated Echo Dot (3rd gen) was unveiled with a fabric covering.

In January 2019, Amazon's SVP of devices and services, Dave Limp, revealed that over 100 million Alexa-enabled devices had been sold. The company's earnings reports and press releases also reveal that the Echo Dot has been among the top-selling products on Amazon.com for 2017 and 2018.

In July 2021, Amazon ran a promotion to give a price discount on the Echo Dot, reducing the price from $39.99 to $4.99 with a coupon code.

4th Gen 
In September 2020, the fourth generation Echo Dot was revealed with a new spherical design and 30% smaller compared to the 3rd gen Echo.

5th Gen 
In September 2022, a few improvements were available for purchase with the fifth generation Echo Dot: a new temperature sensor and improved audio experience with clearer vocals and deeper bass. In addition, it features eero Built-in as a Wi-Fi extender.

Amazon Tap

The Amazon Tap is a smaller portable version of the Echo. The Tap can do the many things the Echo can do; however, as it is battery-powered, it is also portable. Initially, the user had to press an activation button on the front of the Tap to speak commands. However, a February 2017 software update allows the option of activating the Tap with an activation word, just like the Echo and the Dot. Some of the limitations of the Tap include not being able to stream music as part of a group and not being able to send announcements to the device. Additionally the Tap does not support "Drop In" feature and as a result cannot be used for two-way voice communication. Amazon has discontinued the Tap. This has encouraged 3rd party accessory manufacturers to make available battery add-on units for other Echo products.

Echo Look
In April 2017, the Amazon Echo Look was introduced as a camera with Alexa built-in, for US$20 more than the first-generation Echo. The device can provide artificial intelligence outfit recommendations, take photos, and record videos; in addition to the features available on the Echo. It offers Amazon Alexa's key feature plus a camera to take full-length photos and 360-degree videos with built-in AI for fashion advice. As a consumer product, it helps catalog users' outfits and rates their looks based on "machine learning algorithms with advice from fashion specialists.

The device was initially only available for purchase by invitation-only in the U.S. However, it became generally available on June 6, 2018.  Three years later, Echo Look owners received an email from Amazon stating that the device would soon stop working, because Amazon was discontinuing production and sales of the device.  Echo Look owners had a device that they could not use.

Echo Show

In May 2017, Amazon introduced the Echo Show, which features a tactile 7-inch liquid-crystal display screen that can be used for playing media, making video calls (5 MP front camera), and other features. The Echo Show was offered for purchase at a price of $229.99 on June 28, 2017, and was initially only available in the U.S.

A second generation of the Echo Show was unveiled at an Alexa-themed product event by Amazon on September 20, 2018, for release the following month. The new device has a 10-inch touchscreen, improved speakers, and mesh casing. Amazon has released three additional sizes of the Echo Show making them available in 5-, 8-, and 15-inch displays. These devices broke the traditional naming mechanism of naming strictly on generation. They are known as the Echo show 5, Echo Show 8, and Echo Show 15.

Echo Spot

On September 27, 2017, Amazon launched the Echo Spot, a hemispherical device that has the same functions as an Echo Show. The device has a 2.5-inch circular screen, and looks like an alarm clock. The device sold for $129.99. The Echo Spot has been discontinued in all regions.

Echo Plus
On September 27, 2017, Amazon announced the Echo Plus, which released on October 31, 2017. It shares design similarities with the first-generation Echo, but also doubles as a smart home hub, connecting to most common wireless protocols to control connected smart devices within a home. It incorporates seven second-generation far field microphones and noise cancellation, while also supporting Dolby Sound.

In September 2018, a second-generation Echo Plus was released. The new version has a fabric covering and includes an embedded temperature sensor. The Echo Plus has since been discontinued in 2020.

Echo Flex

On November 14, 2019, Amazon released the Echo Flex for $24.99.  It is a small device with a speaker that can be plugged directly into a wall outlet.  It has a full-sized USB Type-A port into the bottom to charge other devices or into which additional accessories, such as a motion sensor, can be plugged.

Speakerless devices
At an Alexa-themed product launch event in September 2018, Amazon announced an Echo device designed for cars. The device connects with the user's smartphone over Bluetooth and offers driving direction, in addition to other Alexa functionality. Echo Auto became available as an invite-only product to US customers near the end of 2018.

The Echo Input is an Alexa input device with no on-board speakers. It must be connected to external speakers for audio output. The Echo Link is a higher-end version of the Echo Input, with additional output ports and a volume knob. The Echo Link Amp has the same controls of the Link, but with an amplifier.

Accessories
Along with the second-generation Echo, Amazon announced two new accessories. The Echo Buttons can be used while playing games on Echo devices, such as Jeopardy!. The Echo Connect is a small adapter that plugs into any Echo and a home phone line, allowing the Echo to make voice calls through a home phone number.

In September 2018, Amazon announced the Echo Sub, a subwoofer that connects to other Echo speakers, and the Echo Wall Clock, which can display how much time is remaining on timers set with an Echo device.

Wearables 
Amazon announced the Echo Loop in September 2019, a smart ring with a button that activates Alexa. The Echo Loop uses Bluetooth to connect to a smartphone for Internet access. The Echo Frames smartglasses, which support prescription lenses, were also announced on the same day. In 2020, it was announced that Echo Loop would be discontinued.

Privacy concerns
There are concerns about the access Echo has to private conversations in the home, or other non-verbal indications that can identify who is present in the home and who is not—based on audible cues such as footstep cadence or radio and television programming. Amazon responds to these concerns by stating that Echo only streams recordings from the user's home when the "wake word" activates the device, though the device is technically capable of streaming voice recordings at all times, and in fact will always be listening to detect if a user has uttered the word.

Echo uses past voice recordings the user has sent to the cloud service to improve response to future questions the user may pose. To address privacy concerns, the user can delete voice recordings that are currently associated with the user's account, but doing so may degrade the user's experience using voice search. To delete these recordings, the user can visit the "Manage My Device" page on Amazon.com or contact Amazon customer service. In May 2018, it was reported that an Echo device had sent a recorded conversation to an acquaintance of a user who did not intend for this to happen. Amazon apologized and conjectured that one part of the conversation had been misinterpreted as a command to distribute it.

Echo uses an address set in the Alexa companion app when it needs a location. Amazon and third-party apps and websites use location information to provide location-based services and store this information to provide voice services, the Maps app, Find Your Device, and to monitor the performance and accuracy of location services. For example, Echo voice services use the user's location to respond to the user's requests for nearby restaurants or stores. Similarly, Echo uses the user's location to process the user's mapping-related requests and improve the Maps experience. All information collected is subject to the Amazon.com Privacy Notice.

Amazon retains digital recordings of users' audio spoken after the "wake up word", and while the audio recordings are subject to demands by law enforcement, government agents, and other entities via subpoena, Amazon publishes some information about the warrants it receives, the subpoenas it receives, and some of the warrant-less demands it receives, allowing customers some indication as to the percentage of illegal demands for customer information it receives.

As Amazon employed ex-US-security-chief Gen Keith B. Alexander in autumn 2020, Edward Snowden commented laconically: "It turns out 'Hey Alexa' is short for 'Hey Keith Alexander."

Echo as criminal evidence
During the course of the investigation into the November 22, 2015, death of Victor Collins in the home of James Andrew Bates in Bentonville, Arkansas, police sought the data stored on the Amazon Echo on the premises as evidence, but were refused by Amazon. The conflict was resolved when Bates consented to the release of his personal information that was held by the company.

Concerns relating to in-car smart systems 
In February 2017, Luke Millanta successfully demonstrated how an Echo could be connected to, and used to control, a Tesla Model S. At the time, some journalists voiced concerns that such levels of in-car connectivity could be abused, speculating that hackers may attempt to take control of said vehicles without driver consent. Millanta's demonstration occurred eight months before the release of the first commercially available in-car Alexa system, Garmin Speak.

Limitations
Purchasing merchandise in the categories of apparel, shoes, jewelry, and watches is not available. In addition, Amazon Prime Pantry, Prime Now, or Add-On items are not supported by Alexa's ordering function, while the shopping list function allows no more than one item to be added at a time.

Echo has provided inconsistent responses when asked common questions to which users would expect better answers. Echo sometimes confuses certain homophones.

See also
 Google Nest
 HomePod
 INVOKE

References

External links

 
Unacceptable, where is my privacy? Exploring Accidental Triggers of Smart Speakers

Echo
Products introduced in 2014
Smart speakers
Smart home hubs